The Aylmer District (District 1) is a municipal district in the city of Gatineau, Quebec. It is represented on Gatineau City Council by Steven Boivin.

The district is located in the Aylmer sector of the city. It is one five districts in the sector. The district includes the neighbourhoods of Wychwood, Parc-Aylmer, Downtown Aylmer, Les Cêdres and McLeod.

For the 2009 election, it gained the neighbourhood of Queen's Park and some of the downtown.

Councillors
André Levac (2001-2005)
Frank Thérien (2005-2009)
Stefan Psenak (2009-2013)
Josée Lacasse (2013-2017)
Audrey Bureau (2017–2021)
Steven Boivin (2021–present)

Election results

2021

2017

2013

2009

2005

2001

References

Districts of Gatineau